Manuel Ramos (born 16 December 1953) is a Spanish professional golfer. He won the 1977 Portuguese Open on his first European Tour start. Trailing Hugh Baiocchi by three strokes after three rounds he had a final round five-under-par 68 at Penina to win by two shots. Each player played one of the first two rounds at the nearby par-71 Palmares golf course. This was to be Ramos's only top-10 finish in a European Tour event. Later in 1977 Ramos won a car for making a hole-in-one in the French Open.

Professional wins (1)

European Tour wins (1)

References

External links

Spanish male golfers
European Tour golfers
1953 births
Living people
20th-century Spanish people
21st-century Spanish people